The 1917 Wisbech by-election was a by-election held on 14 December 1917 for the House of Commons constituency of Wisbech in Cambridgeshire.

Vacancy

The election was caused by the death of sitting Liberal MP, the Hon. Neil Primrose MC, the son of the former Liberal prime minister Lord Rosebery on 15 November 1917. Primrose died of wounds received in battle at Gezer during the Sinai and Palestine Campaign.

Candidates
The Liberals selected Colin Coote, a serving officer in the Gloucestershire Regiment who was granted leave to contest the election. Being their partners in the coalition government of David Lloyd George, the Unionists also supported Coote’s nomination and no other candidates came forward.

The result
Accordingly, Coote was returned unopposed. At 24 years of age, he was one of the youngest members of the House.

References

See also

List of United Kingdom by-elections (1900–1918)

1917 in England
1917 elections in the United Kingdom
By-elections to the Parliament of the United Kingdom in Cambridgeshire constituencies
By-elections to the Parliament of the United Kingdom in Norfolk constituencies
Unopposed by-elections to the Parliament of the United Kingdom (need citation)
20th century in Cambridgeshire